Steve Cyr (born 20 May 1967) is a Canadian former biathlete who competed in the 1992 Winter Olympics, in the 1994 Winter Olympics, and in the 1998 Winter Olympics.

References

1967 births
Living people
Canadian male biathletes
Olympic biathletes of Canada
Biathletes at the 1992 Winter Olympics
Biathletes at the 1994 Winter Olympics
Biathletes at the 1998 Winter Olympics